Christoph of Württemberg (12 May 1515 – 28 December 1568), ruled as Duke of Württemberg from 1550 until his death in 1568.

Life 
In November 1515, only months after his birth, his mother, Sabina of Bavaria, fled to the court of her parents in Munich. Young Christoph stayed in Stuttgart with his elder sister Anna and his father, Duke Ulrich. When the Swabian League mobilized troops against Ulrich, he brought them to Castle Hohentübingen. In 1519 Württemberg came under Austrian rule after the castle surrendered and Duke Ulrich was banished.

Christoph was sent to the court of Holy Roman Emperor Maximilian I in Innsbruck where he grew up and was able to gain political experience under Habsburg tutelage. Maximilian's successor  Charles V took him on his travels through Europe.

Meanwhile, his father Ulrich had regained Württemberg from the Austrians in 1534 and Christoph was sent to the French court, where he became embroiled in France's wars against the Habsburgs. At the end of the 1530s, Christoph converted to Protestantism. In 1542, the Treaty of Reichenweier installed him as the governor of the Württemberg region of Montbéliard.

On succeeding his father in 1550, Christoph was forced to make high payments to avoid charges of treason by Holy Roman Emperor Ferdinand I.

In subsequent years, he re-organized the entire administration of the church and state. He also reformed and supported the educational system. Christoph gave Amandenhof castle near Urach to Hans von Ungnad who used it as the seat of the South Slavic Bible Institute.

Christoph went to great efforts to boost Württemberg's profile. For example, he reconstructed the Altes Schloss in Stuttgart and hosted many celebrations.

Marriage and issue 
In 1544 he married Anna Maria (28 December 1526 – 20 May 1589), daughter of George, Margrave of Brandenburg-Ansbach, with whom he fathered twelve children.

 Eberhard (7 January 1545 – 2 May 1568)
 Hedwig (15 May 1547 – 4 March 1590) – married Louis IV, Landgrave of Hesse-Marburg
 Elisabeth (3 March 1548 – 28 February 1592) – married (1) Georg Ernst (1511–1583), Count von Henneberg-Schleusingen; (2) Georg Gustav (1564–1634), Count Palatine of Veldenz-Lauterecken
 Sabine (2 July 1549 – 17 August 1582) – married William IV, Landgrave of Hesse-Kassel
 Emilie (19 August 1550 – 4 June 1589) – married Reichard (1521–1598), Count Palatine of Simmern-Sponheim
 Eleonore (22 March 1552 – 12 January 1618) – married Joachim Ernest, Prince of Anhalt; (2) George I, Landgrave of Hesse-Darmstadt
 Ludwig I (1 January 1554 – 8 August 1593) – succeeded as Duke of Württemberg
 Maximilian (27 August 1556 – 17 March 1557)
 Ulrich (May 1558 – 7 July 1558)
 Dorothea Maria (3 September 1559 – 23 March 1639) – married Otto Heinrich, Count Palatine of Sulzbach
 Anna (12 June 1561 – 7 July 1616) – married (1) Duke John George of Oława; (2) Duke Frederick IV of Legnica
 Sophie (20 November 1563 – 21 July 1590) – married Friedrich Wilhelm I, Duke of Saxe-Weimar

Ancestors

References

Sources 

 

Wurttemberg, Christoph, Duke of
Wurttemberg, Christoph, Duke of
16th-century dukes of Württemberg
People from Bad Urach
Converts to Lutheranism from Roman Catholicism
Soldiers of the Imperial Circles